is a professional Japanese baseball player. He plays pitcher for the Saitama Seibu Lions.

Career
In , Honda was named a NPB All-Star.

References 

1993 births
Living people
Baseball people from Miyagi Prefecture
Tohoku Gakuin University alumni
Japanese baseball players
Nippon Professional Baseball pitchers
Saitama Seibu Lions players